The 2012 Northern Colorado Bears football team represented the University of Northern Colorado in the 2012 NCAA Division I FCS football season. They were led by second-year head coach Earnest Collins Jr. and played their home games at Nottingham Field. They are a member of the Big Sky Conference. They finished the season 5–6, 4–4 in Big Sky play to finish in a three way tie for fifth place.

Schedule

Despite Sacramento State also being a member of the Big Sky, their meeting on September 15 was considered a non-conference game.
Source: Official Schedule

Game summaries

@ Utah

Colorado Mesa

The win is the Bears first win since the final game of the 2010 season against Portland State, a span of 12 games. It is also just their second win in their last 21 games.

@ Sacramento State

@ Montana State

Montana

@ Cal Poly

Idaho State

Northern Arizona

@ Portland State

@ Weber State

North Dakota

References

Northern Colorado
Northern Colorado Bears football seasons
Northern Colorado Bears football